Parliamentary elections were held in Ivory Coast on 6 March 2021. The previous elections, held in 2016, saw the presidential coalition (the Rally of Houphouëtists for Democracy and Peace, composed of the Rally of the Republicans, the Democratic Party of Ivory Coast – African Democratic Rally, and some minor parties) win more than the half the seats in the National Assembly.

Electoral system
The National Assembly is the lower house of the bicameral parliament. Of its 255 members, 169 are elected in single-member constituencies by first-past-the-post voting and the remaining 86 are elected from 36 constituencies of between two and six seats by general ticket voting, with the list of candidates that receives the most votes winning all seats to be filled.

Following a decree in November 2020, 30% of the total candidates from each party must be women. The decree also encourages parties to present more by providing additional public funding to those whose share of female candidates exceeds 50%.

Results
Rally of Houphouëtists for Democracy and Peace (RHDP) won 137 of 254 contested seats in the election, according to official results. Union for Democracy and Peace in Ivory Coast (UDPCI) claimed fraud and the Ivorian Popular Front (FPI) appealed for calm. One seat remained open on March 10 because a candidate died during the campaign. The elections were peaceful and turnout was 37.88%, with 2,788,022 voters participating out of 7,359,399 registered. There were 82,184 null ballots and 34,083 blank ballots.

Patrick Achi was named interim Prime Minister on March 8, during the illness of Hamed Bakayoko. Bakayoko died of cancer on March 10.

The largest opposition grouping will mostly likely be a coalition formed by Henri Konan Bedie′s UPDCI and Laurent Gbagbo's FPI, which won 50 seats.

References

External links

Ivory
2021 in Ivory Coast
Elections in Ivory Coast
March 2021 events in Africa